Bontnewydd is a small village in Ceredigion between Tregaron and Aberystwyth near the village of Bronant. It is situated on the edge of the beautiful wild area of upland common called Mynydd Bach. The rivers Ddu and Aeron meet to the south-east of the village. The Llyn Eiddwen SSSI is close by.

References

Villages in Ceredigion